Daniel Petru Funeriu (born April 11, 1971) is a Romanian politician.

Born in Arad, he was a gifted high school student in chemistry who in 1988 fled Communist Romania for France. There, he studied chemistry at the University of Strasbourg, graduating in 1994 and obtaining a doctorate from the same institution in 1999.

From December 2008 to July 2009, Funeriu represented Romania in the European Parliament, sitting for the Democratic Liberal Party. From December 2009 until February 2012, he was Education Minister under Emil Boc. Shortly thereafter, he became an advisor to President Traian Băsescu.

Notes 

People from Arad, Romania
Romanian emigrants to France
Romanian presidential advisors
MEPs for Romania 2007–2009
Democratic Liberal Party (Romania) MEPs
Romanian Ministers of Education
1971 births
Living people